The Men's 50 km walk event at the 2006 European Championships was held on Thursday August 10, 2006 in Gothenburg, Sweden, with the start at 09:40h.

Medalists

Abbreviations
All times shown are in hours:minutes:seconds

Records

Results

See also
 2006 Race Walking Year Ranking

References
 Official results
 Results

Walk 50 km
Racewalking at the European Athletics Championships